Daebang Station is a train station in Seoul, South Korea, and is also a stop on the Seoul Subway Line 1 and Sillim Line. Before the opening of Line 5, this station served as the main link between the Seoul Metropolitan Subway system and Yeouido, a prominent business district in Seoul. Other places of interest in the vicinity of the station include Noryangjin Park and the Seoul Military Manpower Office, although the latter is closer to Boramae Station on Line 7.

References

External links
 Station information from Korail

Seoul Metropolitan Subway stations
Railway stations opened in 1974
Metro stations in Yeongdeungpo District